50th Street/Minnehaha Park is a light rail station on the Blue Line in Minneapolis, Minnesota, United States.

This station is located on the southwest corner on the intersection of 50th Street with Minnesota State Highway 55 (Hiawatha Avenue), in the Minnehaha neighborhood. This is a side-platform station. Service began at this station when the Blue Line opened on June 26, 2004.

Early on in the design process, there had been some consideration to use a small existing rail station on the other side of the highway for this stop. The Minnehaha Depot, also known as the "Princess Depot," had been built in 1875 and was used for a variety of purposes over the years. The Milwaukee Road used it for the majority of the time until it closed in 1963, and it was part of the Twin City Rapid Transit streetcar system for many years.

Just north of this station is a short tunnel under Minnehaha Parkway.

Notable places nearby
Grand Rounds Scenic Byway
Minneapolis neighborhoods:
Hiawatha
Minnehaha
Minnehaha Falls Regional Park
Minnesota Veterans Home

External links 
Metro Transit: 50th Street/Minnehaha Park Station

Metro Blue Line (Minnesota) stations in Minneapolis
Railway stations in the United States opened in 2004
2004 establishments in Minnesota